Hyuri Henrique de Oliveira Costa (born 29 September 1991), simply known as Hyuri, is a Brazilian footballer who plays for Vila Nova as a forward.

Club career
On 26 January 2014, Hyuri transferred from Botafogo to Chinese Super League side Guizhou Renhe.

On 5 January 2016, Hyuri transferred from Chinese Super League side Guizhou Renhe to Brazilian side Atlético Mineiro through an undisclosed deal. He was one of the reinforcements who came into the club at the beginning of the 2016 season to help Galo regain the Copa Libertadores in 2016. Hyuri made his debut for Atlético in a 3-0 win against Schalke 04 in a friendly played on January 13, 2016.

Selangor 

On 29 January 2022, Hyuri's reach agreement to join Malaysia Super League club Selangor for 2022 season.

References

External links
 

Living people
1991 births
Footballers from Rio de Janeiro (city)
Brazilian footballers
Association football forwards
Campeonato Brasileiro Série A players
Campeonato Brasileiro Série B players
Campeonato Brasileiro Série D players
UAE First Division League players
Audax Rio de Janeiro Esporte Clube players
Botafogo de Futebol e Regatas players
Clube Atlético Mineiro players
Ceará Sporting Club players
Associação Atlética Ponte Preta players
Sport Club do Recife players
Atlético Clube Goianiense players
Chinese Super League players
Beijing Renhe F.C. players
Chongqing Liangjiang Athletic F.C. players
Hatta Club players
Brazilian expatriate footballers
Brazilian expatriate sportspeople in China
Brazilian expatriate sportspeople in the United Arab Emirates
Expatriate footballers in China
Expatriate footballers in the United Arab Emirates